Anant Kumar Agarwal from the Cree Inc., Chapel Hill, NC was named Fellow of the Institute of Electrical and Electronics Engineers (IEEE) in 2012 for contributions to silicon carbide power device technology.

References 

Fellow Members of the IEEE
Living people
Year of birth missing (living people)
American electrical engineers